Oosterse Bos is a hamlet in the Netherlands and is part of the Emmen municipality in Drenthe. 

Oosterse Bos has a statistical entry with Middendorp, however the postal authorities have placed it under Schoonebeek. It was first mentioned in the 1850s as 't Oosteinde, and means the eastern forest.

References 

Populated places in Drenthe
Emmen, Netherlands